Alexandra Worisch (born 29 September 1965) is a former synchronized swimmer from Austria.

References 

1965 births
Living people
Austrian synchronized swimmers
Olympic synchronized swimmers of Austria
Synchronized swimmers at the 1984 Summer Olympics
Synchronized swimmers at the 1986 World Aquatics Championships
Synchronized swimmers at the 1982 World Aquatics Championships